Kang Wook-soon (born 2 June 1966) is a South Korean professional golfer.

Professional career
Kang has played on the Asian Tour since it began in its modern form in 1995. He topped the Order of Merit in 1996 and 1998 and was the first man to reach career earnings of US$500,000 on the tour. In 2002 he was the top player on the Korean Tour. In 2003 he missed out on a PGA Tour card by one shot after three-putting the last hole of Final Qualifying to make bogey. He still qualified to play the Nationwide Tour in 2004, but despite recording a top ten finish in his third outing he left after six events. He has seven career wins on the Asian Tour and a ten wins on the Korean Tour; including three Order of Merits wins in 1999, 2000 and 2001.

Professional wins (18)

Asian Tour wins (7)

1Co-sanctioned by the Korean Tour

Asian Tour playoff record (1–2)

Korean Tour wins (12)
1995 Daily Sports Pocari Open, Champion Series
1999 Bookyung Open, Lance Field KPGA Championship
2000 Maekyung LG Fashion Open (co-sanctioned with the Asian Tour), Leading Investment and Securities Open, Daekyung Open Championship
2001 SBS Open
2002 Pocari Sweat Open
2003 Lancelot Cup Bookyung Open
2008 SBS Johnnie Walker Blue Label Open
2009 SBS Tomato Savings Bank Open

Team appearances
Alfred Dunhill Cup (representing South Korea): 1997, 1998
Asian Nations Cup (representing South Korea): 1999 (with Kim Wan-tae, winners)
World Cup (representing South Korea): 1999
Dynasty Cup (representing Asia): 2003 (winners)

See also
List of golfers with most Asian Tour wins

References

External links

South Korean male golfers
Asian Tour golfers
PGA Tour golfers
Sportspeople from North Gyeongsang Province
Golfers from Seoul
1966 births
Living people